Diarthron is a genus of flowering plant in the family Thymelaeaceae. The precise limits of the genus are uncertain. When broadly circumscribed to include Dendrostellera and Stelleropsis, it consists of annual and perennial herbaceous plants and small shrubs, with reddish, white or green flowers lacking petals, and is found in central and south-west Asia and south-east Europe.

Description
When broadly circumscribed (i.e. including Dendrostellera and Stelleropsis), Diarthron is a genus of annual or perennial herbaceous plants or short deciduous shrubs. Prior to a review in 1982, only the annual species were placed in Diarthron, with the perennial herbs being in Stelleropsis and the shrubs in Dendrostellera. The flowers lack petals. There are usually four (sometimes five) sepals, united at the base into a tube with lobes at the end, reddish, white or green in colour. The ovary has a single chamber (locule). The fruit is dry with the seed enclosed in a thin glossy black pericarp.

Taxonomy
The genus Diarthron was first described in 1832 by Nikolai Turczaninow for the species Diarthron linifolium. Many species were added to the genus in 1982 by Kit Tan, being transferred from related genera. A 2006 study suggested that as circumscribed, Diarthron is not monophyletic, so that Dendrostellera and Stelleropsis which Tan had merged into Diarthron should be reinstated. Studies in 2002 and 2009, based on chloroplast DNA, placed Diarthron in a small group of related genera, sister to a clade consisting of Thymelaea and Daphne; however for most genera only one species was included.

Species
The Plant List (version 1.1, September 2013) recognizes the following species:
Diarthron altaica (Thiéb.-Bern.) Kit Tan
Diarthron antoniniae (Pobed.) Kit Tan
Diarthron arenaria (Pobed.) Kit Tan
Diarthron caucasica (Pobed.) Kit Tan
Diarthron iranica (Pobed.) Kit Tan
Diarthron issykkulensis (Pobed.) Kit Tan
Diarthron lessertii (Wikstr.) Kit Tan
Diarthron linearifolia (Pobed.) Kit Tan
Diarthron linifolium Turcz.
Diarthron macrorhachis (Pobed.) Kit Tan
Diarthron magakjanii (Sosn.) Kit Tan
Diarthron tarbagataica (Pobed.) Kit Tan
Diarthron tianschanica (Pobed.) Kit Tan
Diarthron turkmenorum (Pobed.) Kit Tan
Diarthron vesiculosum (Fisch. & C.A.Mey.) C.A.Mey.

Distribution
Diarthron species are found in central and south-west Asia, and in south-east Europe, including the European part of Russia.

References

Thymelaeoideae
Malvales genera
Taxa named by Nikolai Turczaninow